The Orge is a  long river in France, left tributary of the Seine. Its source is in the village Saint-Martin-de-Bréthencourt. Its course crosses the départements of Yvelines and Essonne. It flows northwest through the towns of Dourdan, Saint-Chéron, Breuillet, Arpajon, and Savigny-sur-Orge, finally flowing into the Seine in Athis-Mons, south of Paris. The towns located on the banks of the river usually have s/ Orge added to their name (i.e. Épinay-sur-Orge, Longpont-sur-Orge, Villiers-sur-Orge). The Yvette is a tributary of the Orge.

Promenade de l'Orge
Many of the local councils maintain parks on the banks of the river. A syndicat has been formed to link the parks of 32 communes. The result is a footpath that ends in Athis-Mons, where the Orge flows into the Seine. Bicycles are allowed on the footpath although pedestrians have right of way. Motorised vehicles are not allowed.

Gallery

References

Rivers of Île-de-France
Rivers of France
Rivers of Yvelines
Rivers of Essonne